Frank Bicet (born 13 November 1971) is a retired Cuban-Spanish discus thrower.

He won the silver medal at the 1990 World Junior Championships, the gold medal at the 1990 Central American and Caribbean Junior Championships, won the gold medal at the 1993 Central American and Caribbean Championships, finished fifth at the 1994 Ibero-American Championships, won the gold medal at the 1995 Central American and Caribbean Championships, and the gold medal at the 1996 Ibero-American Championships.

He later changed his allegiance to Spain. His personal best throw was 61.02 metres, achieved in July 1998 in Havana. Also an able hammer thrower, he recorded 72.15 metres in February 2006 in Havana.

References

1971 births
Living people
Cuban male discus throwers
Spanish male discus throwers
Cuban emigrants to Spain